{{automatic taxobox
| image = 
| image_caption=
| taxon = Peptacetobacter
| authority = Chen et al. 2020
| type_species = Peptacetobacter hominis 
| subdivision_ranks = Species
| subdivision = Peptacetobacter hiranonis Peptacetobacter hominis| synonyms =  
}}Peptacetobacter'' is a genus of bacteria in the family Peptostreptococcaceae.

References

Bacteria genera
Taxa described in 2020
Peptostreptococcaceae